The 1922 United States elections were held on November 7, 1922. The election took place during Republican President Warren G. Harding's term. The Republican Party lost seats in both chambers of Congress, but retained their majority in the House and Senate. In the House, the Republicans lost seventy-seven seats to the Democratic Party. The Republicans also lost seven seats in the U.S. Senate, six to the Democrats and one to the Minnesota Farmer–Labor Party.

The election is notable in that no redistricting occurred despite the completion of the 1920 United States Census, as Congress failed to pass a redistricting bill. This is the only congressional election in which there was no redistricting after a census. The Apportionment Act of 1911 remained in effect until the Reapportionment Act of 1929.

The election was a victory for Harding's progressive opponents in the Republican Party, and helped lead to the Teapot Dome investigations and Robert M. La Follette's 1924 third party candidacy.

See also
1922 United States House of Representatives elections
1922 United States Senate elections
1922 United States gubernatorial elections

References

 
1922
United States midterm elections
November 1922 events